El Calvario Church is a church in Cobán, Guatemala.The terrace of the church is noted for its panoramic views of the city and views of the Rocja Mountains and Xucaneb, the highest point in Alta Verapaz to the southeast.

External links
Calvario Church of Cobán

Roman Catholic churches in Guatemala
Buildings and structures in Cobán